Scott Sommer (February 20, 1951 – November 18, 1993) was an American author. He graduated from Columbia High School (1969) and Ohio Wesleyan University (1973). Sommer was the author of four novels and one collection of short stories.

He was the screenwriter of the film CrissCross starring Goldie Hawn. His novel Nearing's Grace was made into the 2005 feature film Nearing Grace. He appeared as an extra in Crossing Delancey and Knots Landing.

The Writer's Voice offered the "Scott Sommer Fiction Award" annually until 1999. The winner received $1,000 and a special reading.

Books published
 1979 - Nearing's Grace
 1981 - Lifetime (short stories)
 1982 - Last Resort
 1985 - Hazzard's Head
 1989 - Still Lives

References

External links

1951 births
1993 deaths
20th-century American novelists
20th-century American short story writers
American male screenwriters
Ohio Wesleyan University alumni
20th-century American male writers
20th-century American screenwriters